Langbach is a small river of Bavaria, Germany. It is a right tributary of the Mauerner Bach near Nandlstadt.

See also
List of rivers of Bavaria

References 

Rivers of Bavaria
Rivers of Germany